Lenarchus is a genus of northern caddisflies in the family Limnephilidae. There are about 13 described species in Lenarchus.

Species
These 13 species belong to the genus Lenarchus:

 Lenarchus bicornis (McLachlan, 1880)
 Lenarchus brevipennis (Banks, 1899)
 Lenarchus crassus (Banks, 1920)
 Lenarchus devius (McLachlan, 1880)
 Lenarchus expansus Martynov, 1914
 Lenarchus fautini (Denning, 1949)
 Lenarchus fuscostramineus Schmid, 1952
 Lenarchus gravidus (Hagen, 1861)
 Lenarchus keratus (Ross, 1938)
 Lenarchus productus (Morton, 1896)
 Lenarchus rho (Milne, 1935)
 Lenarchus rillus (Milne, 1935)
 Lenarchus vastus (Hagen, 1861)

References

Further reading

 
 
 

Trichoptera genera
Articles created by Qbugbot
Integripalpia